Todd Charlesworth (born March 22, 1965) is a Canadian former professional ice hockey defenceman. He played in the NHL for the Pittsburgh Penguins and the New York Rangers.

Career statistics

External links

1965 births
Living people
Canadian ice hockey defencemen
Baltimore Skipjacks players
Binghamton Rangers players
Cape Breton Oilers players
Flint Spirits players
Muskegon Fury players
Muskegon Lumberjacks players
New York Rangers players
Oshawa Generals players
Pittsburgh Penguins players
Pittsburgh Penguins draft picks
Ice hockey people from Calgary